Alex Macklin (born 1932) is a former Canadian football player who played for the Calgary Stampeders. He previously played at the University of Toronto. During his professional Canadian football career, Alex Macklin played the Guard/Tackle position. The Guard/Tackle position is on the offensive line. Alex's job was to protect the quarterback and block for the running backs. During his career Alex only played two years in the CFL from 1955-1956. This resulted him to only playing in 23 career games.

Stats Crew

References

Living people
1932 births
Players of Canadian football from Ontario
Canadian football guards
Toronto Varsity Blues football players
Calgary Stampeders players
Canadian football people from Toronto